The Al-Wehda Dam (سد الوحدة, Sadd Al-Weḥda, Unity Dam), formerly known as Maqarin Dam, is a  roller-compacted concrete gravity dam on the Yarmouk River on the border between Syria and Jordan. Water from the reservoir is diverted through a diversion weir at Addassiyah downstream of the Al-Wehda dam to the King Abdullah Canal where it is mixed with other freshwater sources. Some of the water from the canal is then pumped to Amman to be used as drinking water, after being treated in the Zai water treatment plant. The discharge of effluents from adjacent agricultural lands has caused algae growth and eutrophication especially in spring. Construction was funded by the Arab Fund for Economic and Social Development (80%), the Abu Dhabi Development Fund (10%) and the Government of Jordan (10%). In February 2004 King Abdullah II of Jordan and Syrian President Bashar al-Assad launched the construction of the dam. Turkey's Ozaltin Company constructed 60 per cent of the dam, while the remaining 40 per cent were carried out by Marwan Alkurdi Company and the National Company for Roads and Bridges.

The sharing of the waters of the Yarmouk River between the two countries is governed by a 1987 treaty that set up a Jordanian-Syrian Yarmouk River Basin Higher Committee. The agreement was renewed in 2001 when the design of the dam was modified, reducing it the storage capacity from 480 to 115 million cubic meters, and removing a hydropower plant that had initially been foreseen from the plans. According to a statement made by the Jordanian Minister of Water and Irrigation, Mousa Jamani, in April 2012 Syria violates the water sharing agreement, because Syrian farmers downstream of the dam use more than the 6 million cubic meters per year that they are entitled to for irrigation along the riverbank. The Minister also said that "since the agreement was signed, the number of Syrian dams increased from 26 to 48, while around 3,500 wells were drilled to pump water from the river basin", thus decreasing the amount of water flowing into the dam's reservoir. Until the 1960s, the Yarmouk River’s flow used to reach 16 cubic meters per second, but has since dropped to only one cubic meter per second.

References

Dams in Syria
Jordan River basin
Dams in Jordan
Dams completed in 2011
Buildings and structures in Daraa Governorate
Roller-compacted concrete dams
Jordan–Syria relations